Bukit Batok Bus Depot is a bus depot located at 550 Bukit Batok Street 23, Singapore 659519.

History
Bukit Batok Bus Depot was built by SBS, commencing operations in January 1985 replacing the old bus depots at Alexandra and Woodlands, including the Portsdown, Whitley and King Albert bus parks. The King Albert bus park was demolished to make way for King Albert Park. The Green Bus garage was formerly located at Toh Tuck, and was relocated in 1974.

References

External links
 Interchanges and Terminals (SBS Transit)

Bus garages
Bus stations in Singapore
1985 establishments in Singapore
Transport infrastructure completed in 1985
20th-century architecture in Singapore